The Sikasya (Hikeyaź; , also: Сиказя́, Сиказа́, Сикия́з) is a river in Ishimbaysky District, a right tributary of the Zigan, in the basin of the Kama.

References

Ishimbaysky District
Rivers of Bashkortostan